Monstera buseyi is a flowering plant in the family Araceae.

Distribution 
It is native to Costa Rica, and Panamá.

References 

buseyi
Flora of Costa Rica
Flora of Panama